Muhd Arif bin Ismail (born 7 March 1986) is a Malaysian footballer who plays as a defender for Malaysia M3 League club KSR Sains.

Club career
He begins his professional career at his hometown team Kuala Lumpur FA. He joined Negeri Sembilan FA in 2007, and his main achievement while at Negeri Sembilan was winning the 2009 Malaysia Cup. In 2010, he joined Perak FA and played for them for two seasons.

He joined Sime Darby F.C. in 2012. His achievement with Sime Darby includes finishing as runners-up in the 2012 Malaysia FA Cup competition, playing in the final as Sime Darby lose to Kelantan FA 1–0.

References

External links
 

1986 births
Living people
Malaysian footballers
Negeri Sembilan FA players
Perak F.C. players
Sime Darby F.C. players
Kuala Lumpur City F.C. players
People from Selangor
Malaysian people of Malay descent
Malaysia international footballers
Association football defenders